Raschid or al-Raschid is a surname, a variant spelling of Rashid. It is the surname of:
Omar bey Al-Raschid (1839–1911), German publicist
Franz Raschid (1954–2010), German footballer
Louiqa Raschid, Sri Lankan-American computer scientist
Mahbubur Raschid, Pakistani banker